Norman Maldonado, (born 1935 in Adjuntas, Puerto Rico), is one of Puerto Rico's top hematologists and served as President of the University of Puerto Rico (UPR).  In 1992, during his presidency, he also chaired the pro-statehood New Progressive Party's platform-drafting committee.  In the years following the election, he helped the governor Pedro Rosselló to initiate the reform of Puerto Rico's health system.  Since 2005, he has published numerous columns for The San Juan Star newspaper, many of them documenting Puerto Rico's medical history.

The Puerto Rico Senate recently passed a bill naming the Puerto Rico Medical Center's University Hospital after Dr. Maldonado, the only medical doctor to have held the post of UPR President.

A native of the mountain town of Adjuntas, he is married to Mary Anne Maldonado, a well known feminist and social activist, and has several grown-up children.

References

1935 births
Living people
People from Adjuntas, Puerto Rico
New Progressive Party (Puerto Rico) politicians
Puerto Rican hematologists
Presidents of the University of Puerto Rico